New Democracy Party may refer to:

New Democracy Party of China
New Democracy Party (Guinea-Bissau)
New Democracy Party (Lithuania)
New Democracy Party (Portugal)
New Democracy Party (South Korea)
New Democracy Party (Thailand)

See also
New Democracy
New Democratic Party